Herman W. Hellman (1843–1906) was a German-born businessman, banker, and real estate investor in Los Angeles, California.

Early life
Herman W. Hellman was born on September 25, 1843, in Reckendorf, Bavaria. He emigrated to the United States with his brother Isaias W. Hellman, arriving in Los Angeles, California on May 14, 1859, as a sixteen-year-old.

Career
He started working as a courier from Wilmington, California to Los Angeles for Phineas Banning. In 1861, he worked for his uncle, Samuel Hellman, who had a store in Los Angeles. Shortly after, he opened his own store at Downey Block.

He established a wholesale grocer's called Hellman, Haas & Co. with Jacob Haas, the brother of Abraham Haas. They sold groceries in Southern California, Arizona, New Mexico and Texas. As his business prospered, he became one of the wealthiest men in Los Angeles by the 1880s. The company later became known as Baruch, Haas, & Co.

In 1890, he became vice president and general manager of The Farmers and Merchants Bank of Los Angeles, a bank established by his brother. He was later demoted by his brother, who found his lending practises too lenient. He resigned in 1903, and became the president of the Merchants National Bank instead. He also became a co-founder of the Los Angeles Chamber of Commerce.

Hellman Buildings
Hellman was a large landowner in Los Angeles. He had many buildings constructed bearing his name over the years:
had built buildings also known as "Hellman Building" (also "H. W. Hellman Building" & "New Hellman Building"):
one mentioned in 1876 on Third Street between Main Street and Spring streets, where a musical boarding school was located
one built in 1882 on Main and Commercial streets "next to Litchenberger's", between Court and First streets
one at Third and Main streets in 1892
another at the northeast corner of Second Street and Broadway in 1897

In 1903, he hired architect Alfred Rosenheim to design the Hellman Building at Fourth and Spring streets. The eight-story building in Downtown Los Angeles still stands today, converted to residential use.

He served as president of the Congregation B'nai B'rith, later known as the Wilshire Boulevard Temple.

Personal life
He married Ida Heimann (1851–1923) who was one of his cousins, on July 26, 1874, while on a trip in Italy. They resided on South Hill Street in Los Angeles and owned a secondary home in Alhambra. They had five children:
Clothilde Hellman (1875–1884)
Frieda Hellman (1876–1944)
Marco H. Hellman (1878–1948), a banker.
Irving H. Hellman (1883–1975) a civil engineer.
Amy Hellman (1888–1920)

Death
He died of a diabetes-induced coma on October 19, 1906, in Los Angeles, California. He was buried at the Home of Peace Cemetery in East Los Angeles.

References

American financial company founders
American real estate businesspeople
1843 births
1906 deaths
American bank presidents
American investment bankers
American financial businesspeople
Land owners from California
Businesspeople from Los Angeles
Deaths from diabetes
German emigrants to the United States
Farmers and Merchants Bank of Los Angeles people
Philanthropists from California
American people of German-Jewish descent
Bavarian emigrants to the United States
People from Bamberg (district)
People from Los Angeles
19th-century American businesspeople
20th-century American businesspeople
19th century in Los Angeles
20th century in Los Angeles
19th-century American philanthropists
People from Reckendorf
Hellman family